The bibliography of John Ashbery includes poetry, literary criticism, art criticism, journalism, drama, fiction, and translations of verse and prose. His most significant body of work is in poetry, having published numerous poetry collections, book-length poems, and limited edition chapbooks. In his capacity as a journalist and art critic, he contributed to magazines like New York and Newsweek. He served for a time as the editor of Art and Literature: an International Review and as executive editor of Art News. In drama and fiction, he wrote five plays and cowrote the novel A Nest of Ninnies with James Schuyler. Beyond his original works, he translated verse and prose from French. Many of his works of poetry, prose, drama, and translations have been compiled in volumes of collected writings.

Books

Verse
Ashbery published 26 books of poetry (not including his limited edition books, listed below). Most of them are poetry collections, which typically contain a mix of new and previously published poems. Flow Chart and Girls on the Run are book-length long poems.

Translated verse

Limited edition
The first edition of these works were printed in a limited edition. They are often printed as chapbooks, with each copy numbered and with a set number of signed copies. Many of these books are collaborations with visual artists or other poets. The contents of these books often share significant overlap with Ashbery's poetry collections; for example, Turandot and Other Poems overlaps significantly with Some Trees.

Prose

Compiled works

Collected verse

Collected prose or drama

Plays

Journalism
Asbery wrote numerous journalistic articles—mostly art criticism—in the International Herald Tribune, New York magazine, Newsweek, and other periodicals. Ashbery also edited the periodicals Art and Literature: An International Review and Art News.

Interviews
Ashbery has been the interviewee in numerous published interviews. There has been one book-length interview published to date: John Ashbery in Conversation with Mark Ford. Only interviews published in books are listed here, not interviews published in periodicals or websites.

Academic theses

Further reading
In 1976, Ashbery's partner David Kermani published a comprehensive 244-page bibliography compiling the author's then-published works.
 
The Ashbery Resource Center maintains a searchable online bibliography. Beyond Ashbery's works, the site also catalogs numerous other works not included here, such as publications of his works in translation and works about Ashbery to which he did not contribute. Like the 1976 bibliography, this online bibliography is overseen by Kermani.

Notes

Citations

Sources

 
Bibliographies by writer
Bibliographies of American writers